The 2020–21 Shrewsbury Town season is the club's 135th season in their history and the sixth consecutive season in EFL League One. Along with League One, the club also participated in the FA Cup, EFL Cup and EFL Trophy.

The season covers the period from 1 July 2020 to 30 June 2021.

Transfers

Transfers in

Loans in

Loans out

Transfers out

Squad

|-
!colspan=14|Players who left the club:

|}

Pre-season
On 10 August, the club announced a pre-season friendly against Southern League Premier Division Central side Nuneaton Borough which would be played at the New Bucks Head ground, the home of AFC Telford United. However, the club's pre-season kicked off with a friendly against Welsh Premier League side Bala Town which was not announced to the public.

All of the club's pre-season games would be played behind closed doors due to the ongoing COVID-19 pandemic.

Competitions

Overview

EFL League One

League table

Results summary

Results by matchday

Matches
The season's League One fixtures were announced on 21 August.

FA Cup

The draw for the first round was made on Monday 26, October. The second round draw was revealed on Monday, 9 November by Danny Cowley. The third round draw was made on 30 November, with Premier League and EFL Championship all entering the competition.

EFL Cup

The first round draw took place in the morning of 18 August.

EFL Trophy

The regional group stage draw was confirmed on 18 August. The second round draw was made by Matt Murray on 20 November, at St Andrew’s.

References

Shrewsbury Town
Shrewsbury Town F.C. seasons